Mike Baron (born July 1, 1949) is an American comic book writer. He is the creator of Badger and the co-creator of Nexus with Steve Rude.

Biography
Mike Baron entered the comics industry with an illustrated text piece in Weird Trips Magazine #1 (March 1974) published by Kitchen Sink Press. In 1981, he published his first formal comics script with Nexus, the science fiction title he co-created with illustrator Steve Rude; the series garnered numerous honors, including Eisner Awards for both creators. A prolific creator, Baron is responsible for The Badger, Ginger Fox, Spyke, Feud, and many other comic book titles. He and artist Jackson Guice relaunched The Flash in June 1987. Baron and Klaus Janson introduced the character Microchip as an ally of the Punisher in The Punisher #4 (November 1987). In 1988, Baron wrote the "Deadman" feature in Action Comics Weekly which led to two subsequent Deadman limited series. Baron has also written numerous other mainstream characters including Batman and several Star Wars adaptations for Dark Horse Comics. In 2014, Baron published Biker, his first novel, about reformed motorcycle hoodlum Josh Pratt. First in the 'Bad Road Rising' series. In 2018, Liberty Island Press will release six Josh Pratt novels, and Disco, a story about a boy and his dog. He has created Q-Ball, a comic about martial arts and espionage, with Barry McClain Jr.

Influences
Baron has listed Carl Barks and Philip José Farmer as influences on his fiction writing.

Awards
Mike Baron received an Inkpot Award in 1988. He has been nominated for Best Writer in the Kirby, Harvey, and Eisner Awards, and has won two Eisners ("Best Single Issue" and "Best Writer/Artist Team" both with Rude) for his work on Nexus.

Bibliography

Blue Line Comics
 Thin Blue Line (2021)

American Mythology Productions
 Florida Man #1-2 (2021-present)

Capital Comics
 Badger #1–4 (1983–1984)
 Nexus #1–3 (1981–1982)
 Nexus vol. 2 #1–6

Dark Horse Comics

 Badger: Shattered Mirror #1–4 (1994)
 Badger: Zen Pop Funny-Animal Version #1–2 (1994)
 Dark Horse Presents #84 (1994)
 Dark Horse Presents vol. 3 #12–14, 23–26 (2012–2013)
 Nexus #89–98 (1996–1997)
 Nexus: Alien Justice #1–3 (1992–1993)
 Nexus: The Origin #1 (1992)
 Nexus: The Wages of Sin #1–4 (1995)
 Star Wars: Dark Force Rising #1–6 (1997)
 Star Wars: Heir to the Empire #1–6 (1995–1996)
 Star Wars: The Last Command #1–6 (1997–1998)
 X-wing Rogue Squadron: The Rebel Opposition #1–4 (1995)

DC Comics

 Action Comics Weekly #601–612, 618–621, 623–626 (1988)
 All-Star Squadron #43 (1985)
 Atari Force #14–20 (1985)
 Batman Annual #12 (1988)
 Batman: Legends of the Dark Knight #154–155 (2002)
 The Brave and the Bold vol. 2 #1–6 (1991–1992)
 The Butcher #1–5 (1990)
 Deadman: Exorcism #1–2 (1992–1993)
 Deadman: Love After Death #1–2 (1989–1990)
 Elvira's House of Mystery #8 (1986)
 The Flash vol. 2 #1–14, Annual #1 (1987–1988)
 Green Lantern vol. 2 #187 (1985)
 Green Lantern Corps Quarterly #6 (1993)
 Hawk and Dove vol. 4 #1–5 (1997–1998)
 Justice League Unlimited #30 (2007)
 Ms. Tree Quarterly #2–3 (1990–1991)
 Question Quarterly #5 (1992)
 Showcase '93 #6–11 (1993)
 Sonic Disruptors #1–7 (1987–1988)
 Teen Titans Spotlight #7–8 (1987)

First Comics

 Badger #5–70 (1985–1991)
 Badger Bedlam #1 (1991)
 Badger Goes Berserk #1–4 (1989)
 The Chronicles of Corum #1–9 (1987–1988)
 Crossroads #2, 5 (1988)
 Hammer of God #1–4 (1990)
 Hexbreaker: A Badger Graphic Novel (1988) 
 Nexus vol. 2 #7–80 (1985–1991)
 The Next Nexus #1–4 (1989)

Malibu Comics
 Bruce Lee #1–6 (1995–1996)

Marvel Comics

 Amazing High Adventure #3, 5 (1986)
 Conan the Savage #8 (1996)
 Epic Illustrated #33 (1985)
 Feud #1–4 (1993)
 Heavy Hitters Annual #1 (1993)
 Heroes for Hope starring the X-Men #1 (1985)
 Marvel Graphic Novel: The Punisher: Intruder (1989)
 The Punisher #1–44, 46–48, 50–62, 76, Annual #1–4 (1987–1993)
 The Punisher: Empty Quarter #1 (1994)
 The Punisher War Journal #16, 25–37 (1990–1991)
 The Punisher: G-Force #1 (1992)
 The Punisher: Origin of Micro Chip #1–2 (1993)
 Spyke #1–4 (1993)
 Strange Tales: Dark Corners #1 (1998)
 Tales of the Marvels: Blockbuster #1 (1995)
 What If...? #83 (1996)

Rude Dude Productions
 Nexus:Space Opera #1–4 (2007–2009)

Valiant Comics

 Archer & Armstrong #13–15, 17–25 (1993–1994)
 Eternal Warrior #25–26 (1994)
 H.A.R.D. Corps #25–30 (1995)
 Magnus, Robot Fighter Yearbook #1 (1994)
 Magnus Robot Fighter/Nexus #1–2 (1994)
 Ninjak #10, Yearbook #1 (1994)
 Shadowman #35–36 (1995)
 Turok, Dinosaur Hunter #10–12, 16, 28, Yearbook #1 (1994–1995)

References

External links

Mike Baron at Mike's Amazing World of Comics
Mike Baron at the Unofficial Handbook of Marvel Comics Creators

1949 births
American comics writers
Eisner Award winners for Best Writer/Artist
Inkpot Award winners
Living people
Writers from Fort Collins, Colorado